Oleksandr Anatoliyovych Shyray (born 21 February 1992) is a Ukrainian professional footballer who plays as a goalkeeper for Chernihiv.

Career
Shyray started his career with the youth team of Yunist Chernihiv before moving to Polissya Dobryanka. In 2012, he moved to Volyn Lutsk. Three years later, he moved to Avangard Korukivka .

FC Chernihiv 
On 23 October 2020 Shyray moved to FC Chernihiv of the Ukrainian Second League. On 27 August 2022 he made his Ukrainian First League debut against Skoruk Tomakivka.

Career statistics

Club

References

External links
Oleksandr Shyray at FC Chernigiv 

1992 births
Living people
Footballers from Chernihiv
Ukrainian footballers
Association football goalkeepers
FC Volyn Lutsk players
FC Yunist Chernihiv players
FC Chernihiv players
FC Avanhard Koriukivka players
Ukrainian Second League players
Ukrainian First League players